Hot R&B/Hip-Hop Songs is a chart published by Billboard that ranks the top-performing songs in the United States in African-American-oriented musical genres; the chart has undergone various name changes since its launch in 1942 to reflect the evolution of such genres.  In 1976, it was published under the title Hot Soul Singles.  During that year, 29 different singles topped the chart, based on playlists submitted by radio stations and surveys of retail sales outlets.

Natalie Cole and the band Earth, Wind & Fire were the only two acts to achieve more than one number one during the year; both acts had two chart-toppers.  "Disco Lady" by Johnnie Taylor was the year's longest-running number one, spending six consecutive weeks in the top spot.  This also made Taylor the act with the highest total number of weeks atop the chart during the year, ahead of four acts which each spent four weeks at number one.  "Disco Lady" was among eight of 1976's soul number ones which also topped the all-genre Hot 100 chart, mostly those in the disco genre which was beginning to dominate American popular music.   "Boogie Fever" by the Sylvers, "Love Hangover" by Diana Ross, "Kiss and Say Goodbye" by the Manhattans, "(Shake, Shake, Shake) Shake Your Booty" by KC & the Sunshine Band, "Play That Funky Music" by Wild Cherry, "You Don't Have to Be a Star (To Be in My Show)" by Marilyn McCoo and Billy Davis Jr., and "Car Wash" by Rose Royce also reached the top of both listings.  In contrast, "Turning Point" by Tyrone Davis spent a week at number one on the soul singles chart in February but failed to enter the Hot 100 at all, the first time this had occurred since the Hot 100 was launched in 1958.

A number of acts topped the chart in 1976 for the first time in their respective careers, including the band Brick, which spent four weeks at number one with the track "Dazz", named for the band's fusion of disco and jazz.  David Ruffin, who had sung on several chart-toppers by the Temptations, gained his first and only solo number one in January with "Walk Away from Love".  Marilyn McCoo and Billy Davis Jr. topped the chart for the first time in November, one position higher than they had reached as members of the 5th Dimension.  The Manhattans and Lou Rawls both reached number one for the first time ten years after they first entered the chart.  The Sylvers, Brass Construction, Candi Staton, the Brothers Johnson, Wild Cherry, and L.T.D. all also made their first appearances at the top of the chart in 1976, as did Rose Royce, who had the final number one of the year.

Chart history

References

1976
1976 record charts
1976 in American music